Emin Doybak (1930 – 13 November 2009) was a Turkish sprinter. He competed in the men's 400 metres at the 1952 Summer Olympics.

References

1930 births
2009 deaths
Athletes (track and field) at the 1952 Summer Olympics
Turkish male sprinters
Turkish male hurdlers
Olympic athletes of Turkey
Place of birth missing